The Woman Thief (French: Le voleur de femmes) is a 1938 French-Italian drama film directed by Abel Gance and starring Jules Berry, Annie Ducaux and Suzanne Desprès.

It was made at the Pisorno Studios in Tirrenia. The film's sets were designed by Jacques Colombier.

Cast

References

Bibliography 
 Frank Burke. A Companion to Italian Cinema. John Wiley & Sons, 2017.

External links 
 

1938 drama films
French drama films
Italian drama films
1938 films
1930s French-language films
Films directed by Abel Gance
1930s Italian-language films
French multilingual films
French black-and-white films
Italian black-and-white films
Italian multilingual films
1938 multilingual films
1930s French films